The men's doubles of the 2020 RPM Open tournament took place on clay in Prague, Czech Republic.

This was the first edition of the tournament.

Sander Arends and David Pel won the title after defeating André Göransson and Gonçalo Oliveira 7–5, 7–6(7–5) in the final.

Seeds

Draw

References

 Main draw

RPM Open - Doubles